Wheel is an unincorporated community in Bedford County, in the U.S. state of Tennessee.  It lies along State Route 64 west of Shelbyville.

History
A post office called Wheel was established in 1888, and remained in operation until 1902. The community was so named for the Agricultural Wheel, a farmers' alliance prominent in late 19th-century state politics.

References

Unincorporated communities in Bedford County, Tennessee
Unincorporated communities in Tennessee